The New Zealand Women of Influence Awards are an annual set of awards which recognise women who make a difference to everyday New Zealanders' lives. The Awards were first made in 2013 and were initially sponsored by Westpac Bank. In 2016, Stuff NZ became a joint sponsor.

Nominations are invited from the public. A panel selects finalists in each category, who are invited to an awards dinner at the Aotea Centre in Auckland where the recipients are announced. In 2021 the awards dinner was not held due to the COVID-19 pandemic.

Categories 
The Awards were initially presented in seven categories; additional categories have since been introduced and as of 2020 the Awards are made in ten categories: Board and Management, Business Enterprise, Innovation and Science, Young Leader, Arts and Culture, Public Policy, Community and Not-for-profit, Diversity, Global and Rural. In addition, there is a Supreme Award, which is awarded each year, and a Lifetime Achievement Award, which has been awarded four times.

The category Innovation and Science was titled Science, Health and Innovation until 2019. In 2021 it was renamed Innovation, Science and Health. The category Young Leader was titled Emerging Leader in 2013 and 2014. The category Arts and Culture was titled Arts in 2013 and 2014. The category Community and Not-for-Profit was titled Community and Social in 2013, Community in 2014 and Community Hero in 2021.

The category Social Enterprise has been awarded once, in 2014. The category Local and Regional has been awarded twice, in 2013 and in 2014.

In 2021, the category Global was not awarded, a category Environment was added and the category Rural was re-named Primary Industries.

Judges 
Dame Silvia Cartwright is the head of the judging panel. On the 2020 panel with her were Sir John Kirwan, Vanisa Dhiru, Abbie Reynolds, Sinead Boucher and Gina Dellabarca. In 2021 Francene Wineti replaced Sir John Kirwan on the panel.

Recipients

See also

 List of awards honoring women

References

New Zealand awards
Awards honoring women
2013 establishments in New Zealand
Awards established in 2013